Portland, Maine, held an election for mayor on November 5, 2019. It was the third election to be held since Portland voters approved a citywide referendum changing the city charter to recreate an elected mayor position in 2010.

Kate Snyder, the newly citizen-elected mayor, won a four-year term in the full-time position,  and will exercise the powers and duties enumerated in Article II Section 5 of the Portland City Charter. She was elected using ranked choice voting. With rest of the elected municipal government in Portland, the post is officially non-partisan. Incumbent Mayor Ethan Strimling running for re-election, was challenged by city councilor Spencer Thibodeau, former Portland School Board Chair Kate Snyder and East End resident Travis Curran.

Every candidate running for Mayor in the heavily Democratic city was a registered member of the Maine Democratic Party.

Candidates

Declared 
Travis Curran, waiter, East End resident
Kate Snyder, nonprofit executive, former Chair of the Portland School Board, Oakdale resident
Ethan Strimling, incumbent mayor, West End resident
Spencer Thibodeau, real estate lawyer, City Councilor for District 2, Parkside resident

Failed to qualify for ballot 
Mark Hodgdon, Libbytown resident
Ronald E. Gordius III, West Bayside resident
Thaddeus St. John, businessman, Munjoy Hill resident

Withdrawn 
Justin Costa, City Councilor for District 4 and East Deering resident
Belinda Ray, City Councilor for District 1 and East Bayside resident
Joseph Bernatche, Riverton resident, Army veteran

Campaign

Endorsements

Polling

Results 
The official election results were:

Notes

References

External links 
Official campaign websites
 Kate Snyder for Mayor 
 Ethan Strimling for Mayor 
 Spencer Thibodeau for Mayor

2019 Maine elections
2019 United States mayoral elections
2019
21st century in Portland, Maine
Non-partisan elections